Anneliese Uhlig (27 August 1918 – 17 June 2017) was a German-born film actress.

Uhlig made her film debut in 1937, and went on to appear in a number of leading roles in Germany cinema during the Nazi era. She was also one of a number of foreign figures to appear in Italian films during the era. After the war she married an American, lived in the United States and in South East Asia, and worked as a journalist and lecturer. Uhlig died in June 2017 at the age of 98.

German leading lady of the 1930s and 1940s, discovered by Thea von Harbou and on stage from 1938.

In 1940, she was brought to Lanke, the country estate of Hitler's propaganda minister and film minister, Josef Goebbels.  He told her it was a unique chance for her to have an affair with one of the greatest men in all of Germany (himself) and promised her a great career.  She rebuffed his advances and three days later, work on her film was stopped.  Goebbels' undersecretary, Karl Hanke found out about the incident and brought her to Frau Goebbels to tell her story.  She asked Annaliese her side of the story and after she shared what happened to her, Magda burst into tears.  She told Anneliese "I confronted my husband and he said 'on the lives of our children, it wasn't like that.', but when I hear it from you, I have to believe you."  Josef lorded his power over the film industry and slept with most actresses.  Those who wouldn't touch him found themselves out of work.  Josef Goebbels consequently prevented her from acting in German films.  However, her close friend, opera star Maria Cebotari, secured for her work in the Italian film industry. After making five pictures in Italy she was ordered back to Germany in 1943 to be utilised for army welfare. She was subsequently employed as translator/caretaker for the expatriate family of deposed dictator Benito Mussolini who had been moved to a Bavarian castle.

Filmography

References

Bibliography 
 Brunetta, Gian Piero. The History of Italian Cinema: A Guide to Italian Film from Its Origins to the Twenty-first Century.  Princeton University Press, 2009. 
 Goble, Alan. The Complete Index to Literary Sources in Film. Walter de Gruyter, 1999.

External links 
 

1918 births
2017 deaths
German film actresses
20th-century German actresses
Actors from Essen
German emigrants to the United States